The LIV Golf Invitational London is a golf tournament that is held at the Centurion Club near Hemel Hempstead, England. The inaugural tournament was held in June 2022 as part of the LIV Golf Invitational Series, a golf series led by Greg Norman and funded by the Saudi Arabian Public Investment Fund. The 2022 48-player field included Phil Mickelson, Dustin Johnson, Sergio García, and Kevin Na.

Charl Schwartzel won the inaugural event, finishing one shot ahead of Hennie du Plessis.

Format
The tournament was a 54-hole individual stroke play event, with a team element. Four man teams were selected via a draft by their designated team captains, with a set number of their total scores counting for the team on each day. Each round commenced with a shotgun start, with the leaders beginning on the first hole for the final round, in order to finish on the eighteenth.

Inaugural field
48 golfers participated in the inaugural LIV London event. 43 players were invited, with the remaining five qualifying through the Asian Tour's International Series; three through an order of merit and the two highest finishers in the International Series England not already in the field.

Oliver Bekker
Richard Bland
Itthipat Buranatanyarat (q)
Laurie Canter
Ratchanon Chantananuwat (a)
Hennie du Plessis
Oliver Fisher
Sergio García
Talor Gooch
Branden Grace
Justin Harding
Sam Horsfield
Dustin Johnson
Matt Jones
Sadom Kaewkanjana
Martin Kaymer
Phachara Khongwatmai
Sihwan Kim
Ryosuke Kinoshita
Chase Koepka
Jinichiro Kozuma
Pablo Larrazábal
Viraj Madappa (q)
Graeme McDowell
Phil Mickelson
Jediah Morgan
Kevin Na
Shaun Norris
Andy Ogletree
Louis Oosthuizen
Wade Ormsby
Adrián Otaegui
Turk Pettit
James Piot
Ian Poulter
David Puig (a)
J. C. Ritchie
Charl Schwartzel
Travis Smyth (q)
Ian Snyman (q)
Hudson Swafford
Hideto Tanihara
Peter Uihlein
Scott Vincent
Lee Westwood
Bernd Wiesberger
Blake Windred
Kevin Yuan (q)

Winners

Individual

Team

Notes

References

London
Golf tournaments in England
June 2022 sports events in the United Kingdom